Thunder in the Sky is an EP released in 2009 by the heavy metal band Manowar, promoting the upcoming full-length album The Lord of Steel. However none of the songs are included on that album, and with the exception of the original version of "Crown and the Ring" on any Manowar album.

The EP was sold during the Death to Infidels Tour in all concert locations. It was also available for purchase as a digital album on the Kingdom Of Steel Online Store, the official Manowar online store.

The EP contains 16 different versions of the song "Father", all sung in different languages. In addition to the English version, it was also sung in: Bulgarian, Croatian, Finnish, French, German, Greek, Hungarian, Italian, Japanese, Norwegian, Polish, Brazilian Portuguese, Romanian, Spanish and Turkish.

Eric Adams was guided through the singing process by fans who volunteered to translate from each country. This is one of few times when a Manowar song was officially translated and performed by the band.

This album also includes a re-recorded metal version of Manowar's epic-ballad "The Crown & the Ring", which is very popular among Manowar fans.

Track listing

Charts

Manowar albums
2009 EPs